James Ashley Thorpe (born 20 January 1991) is an English cricketer. Thorpe is a right-handed batsman who bowls right-arm medium-fast. He was born in Switzerland at Geneva. Thorpe was educated at Warden Park School, before attending the University of Bath.

Thorpe made a single List A appearance for Sussex against the touring Bangladeshis at the County Ground, Hove, in 2010. Batting at number ten, Adkin contributed 3 runs to Sussex's total of 253 all out, ending the innings not out. He took the wicket of Tamim Iqbal in the Bangladeshis innings, finishing with figures of 1/26 from three overs. Sussex dismissing the Bangladeshis for 104 to win the match by 149 runs. In August 2010, Thorpe made two Youth One Day Internationals for England Under-19s against Sri Lanka Under-19s, with both appearances coming at Arundel Castle Cricket Ground. In that same month he played a single Youth Twenty20 International against the same opposition at the Riverside Ground, Chester-le-Street.

References

External links
James Thorpe at ESPNcricinfo
James Thorpe at CricketArchive

1991 births
Living people
People educated at Warden Park School
Alumni of the University of Bath
English cricketers
English expatriate sportspeople in Switzerland
Sussex cricketers
Sportspeople from Geneva